Nyi Nyi Lwin (born 11 August 1983) is Burmese footballer. He plays for club Zeyashwemye in Myanmar National League as a goalkeeper. He was called to Myanmar national football team at the 2010 AFF Suzuki Cup as a reserve player.

References

External links 
 

1983 births
Living people
Burmese footballers
Myanmar international footballers
Association football goalkeepers
Place of birth missing (living people)